Pune Football Club was an Indian professional football club based in Pune, Maharashtra. The club has competed in the I-League, then top flight of Indian football league system. The club was one of the most professional clubs in Indian football history, known mainly for their focus on fanfare, professional playing set-up, and focus on youth development. The club was owned by the Ashok Piramal Group.

Founded in 2007, the club managed to gain promotion to the I-League in 2009. In their first season in the I-League, the club managed to finish in a very surprising third place before having their best ever season during the 2012–13 season in which they finished in second place.

Pune used to have a rivalry with fellow Maharashtra club Mumbai FC, with whom it contested the Maha derby.

The club pulled out of I-League earlier 2015–16 season. The main club shut down its operations while Pune F.C. Academy was acquired by ISL club, FC Pune City. It was dissolved in 2016.

History

Foundation
In 2007, Indian football was in the process of a renovation, mainly with the start of the I-League replacing the old National Football League. However, despite this, the All India Football Federation still had trouble attracting investors to create new clubs, specially outside of West Bengal, Goa, and North East India due to the fact that, despite a good number of fans in these areas and good wages to players, the clubs in these regions still had trouble creating any profit.

Ashok Piramal Group, a company based in Maharashtra, however did the opposite. Despite the city of Pune not having much history when it comes to football or much support for the sport, which is overshadowed by cricket, Ashok Piramal Group still created Pune Football Club in 2007. In creating the club they created one of the first clubs in India named after the city they were playing in and representing. The club also got invitation and participated in TFA Shield tournament, organized by Tamil Nadu Football Association (TFA).

I-League 2nd Division (2008–2009)

In preparation for their first ever season in the I-League 2nd Division, the club signed mainly a bunch of unknown players and also signed on Stewart Hall as the first head coach of the club. The club were grouped in Group A during the 2008 I-League 2nd Division along with Vasco, ONGC, HAL, and Chirag United. Midway through their 2nd Division campaign the club changed coaches, going from Stewart Hall to former Northern Ireland national teamer, Bernard McNally. The club finished in third place in Group A and thus failed to advance further that campaign.

The club then participated the next year in the 2009 I-League 2nd Division where there were now four promotion spots up for grabs instead of the usual two as the I-League was going to expand. Before the season began the club re-hired former coach Stewart Hall to coach the club. Also before the season the club managed to make many changes to the squad. At the end of the season Pune managed to finish in fourth place with a 3–0 victory over SESA Football Academy and thus earn promotion to the I-League for the first time in their history.

Early I-League and Derrick Pereira Era (2009–2013)

Pune Football Club's first season in the I-League was the 2009–10 season. Pune selected the Balewadi Sports Complex in Balewadi, a suburb of Pune, as their home stadium. Before the season began the club made headlines when they signed the current India number 1 goalkeeper, Subrata Pal, from East Bengal and by also signing Japanese midfielder Arata Izumi from Mahindra United. At the same time the club also signed Derrick Pereira to be the head coach of the team after Stewart Hall resigned. Before joining Pune, Pereira was head coach at Mahindra United where he had won the National Football League and the Federation Cup. He also took Mahindra United to the quarter-finals of the AFC Cup in 2007.

Pune played their first I-League match against East Bengal, which was also their first home match in the I-League, on 3 October 2009 in which the final score was 0–0. Pune had no wins, six draws, and two losses in the league before winning their first ever I-League match on 9 January 2010 against JCT 2–1. At the end of the season Pune finished in third place which was called a success by the club due to their weak start in the league.

The summer of 2011 was an important time for Pune. On 23 June 2011, it was announced that Pune would start the Pune F.C. Academy team which would make Pune the first team in I-League with an academy team. Then on 25 July 2011 it was announced that Pune's Brazilian striker Edmar Figueira would join the Portuguese top flight Primeira Liga with C.D. Feirense which would be the first-time a player from the I-League would sign for a team in a top 10 European league based on the UEFA coefficient. Then on 26 September 2011 it was announced that Pune would play English Premier League side Blackburn Rovers, who are owned by Indian owners Venky's, in a friendly. Thus making Pune the first ever Indian club to play a friendly against an English Premier League team. The match was then played on 7 October 2011 at the Balewadi Sports Complex in which Pune lost 0–3 to Blackburn. Then on 22 October 2011, it was announced that Pune had tied-up a partnership with IT giant Infosys which would see more promotion of the club through media networks. Then on 11 June 2012, Pune became the first Indian football team to participate in a transfer between another I-League club, Prayag United, when Pune sold midfielder Lester Fernandez to Prayag for 20 lakh.

The club then finished the 2012–13 season with their best finish yet in the I-League by finishing in 2nd place, just behind Churchill Brothers S.C. for the I-League crown.

Mike Snoei Era (2013–2014)
After the 2012–13 season finished it was announced that coach Derrick Pereira had resigned as Pune FC coach to return to his former club Salgaocar. Soon enough though Pune were able to sign Pereira's replacement in former Vitesse Arnhem head coach, Dutchman Mike Snoei for the new season. Also, with the new coach, came a new direction for Pune with the director of the club, Nandan Piramal, stating that the club would focus mainly on youth development while also mixing youngsters with a good group of senior players. The club then made new signings in the foreign department by signing Superettan player Calum Angus and former A-League player James Meyer. The club also signed current Equatorial Guinea international, Raúl Fabiani, who also played for his adopted country in the 2012 Africa Cup of Nations.

The first tournament the club took part in was the 2013 Durand Cup in which the club sent a mix of players from the first-team and the Pune F.C. Academy with the three senior players being Caitano Costa, Shahinlal Meloly, and Prakash Thorat. The club however did not make it out of the group stages. Pune then played their first I-League match under Snoei on 21 September 2013 against Mohammedan at the Salt Lake Stadium in which Pune won the match 3–1 thanks to a double from Fabiani and a goal from Meyer.

Then, on 29 January 2014, Pune played their first ever international club match when they took on Vietnamese side Hanoi T&T in the 2014 AFC Champions League qualifier first round at the Balewadi Sports Complex. The club however suffered a 3–0 defeat in that match, meaning that they would have to play in the 2014 AFC Cup that season.

In 2014 Durand Cup, held from 20 October to 8 November in Goa, Pune lost 1–0 to Salgaocar SC in final and finished as runners-up.

A month later, Pune FC participated in the 2014 Bhutan King's Cup and faced Assam State Electricity Board in their last group stage match. Thongkhosiem Haokip scored a hat-trick as Pune booked their place into the semi-finals with a 5–0 victory. Then they defeated Mohun Bagan AC through penalty-shootout and reached to the final, in which, they lost 1–0 to Bangladeshi outfit Sheikh Jamal Dhanmondi.

Rivalry
Pune FC used to have a rivalry with fellow Maharashtra-based club Mumbai FC, with whom it contested the "Maha derby". Both the teams faced each other in yearly competitions like I-League and MDFA Elite League.

Disbanding the club
Pune FC enjoyed their best ever campaign during the 2012–13 season, in which they became runners-up. Later in May 2015, ahead of the 2015–16 I-League season, the club was dissolved due to financial crisis. Meanwhile, their academy was purchased by the erstwhile ISL side FC Pune City.

On 26 August 2016, it was announced that FC Pune City of the Indian Super League had taken over the Pune FC Academy and will rebrand it under their name.

Stadium

Since Pune made their debut in the I-League, they have always played at the Balewadi Sports Complex, which is located in Balewadi, a suburb of Pune. The stadium was also the site of the 2008 Commonwealth Youth Games. The club also used the stadium as their home ground for continental tournaments like AFC Cup, and AFC Champions League play-offs.

The club also trained on the outskirts of Pune in an area called Mamurdi on their own training ground. For a season, they used St. Vincent's High School football ground for training, which is located in Pune.

Ownership
Pune FC was owned overall by the Ashok Piramal Group. Peninsula Land Limited CEO Nandan Piramal was last chairman of the club.

Kit manufacturers and shirt sponsors

Academy & youth

Since their inception in 2007, Pune FC operated its U19, and U17 youth teams. On 23 June 2011, it was announced that the club would open an Academy at the U20 level, thus becoming the first I-League team to do so, and they later competed in U19 I-League. The academy was fully known as Peninsula Pune Football Club Academy (PPFCA), and produced numerous Indian talents.

Notable players

Foreign players
This list comprises foreign players who either represented their respective countries in international level before or after playing for Pune FC or played for the club in matches of I-League.
  Cyd Gray (2008)
  Edgar Marcelino (2009–2014)
  Douhou Pierre (2009–2014)
  Lamine Tamba (2010–2011)
  Mandjou Keita (2010–2012)
  Karma Tsewang (2011–2013)
  James Meyer (2012–2013)
  James Moga (2012–2013)
  Daisuke Nishiguchi (2012–2013)
  Raúl Iván Fabiani (2013)
  Sewram Gobin (2013)
  Riga Mustapha (2013–2014)
  Calum Angus (2013–2014)
  Chika Wali (2013–2014)
  Ryuji Sueoka (2014–2015)
  Luciano Sabrosa (2014–2015)
  Darko Nikač (2015)

Managerial history

Last technical staff

As of October 2013.

Club honours

Domestic
I-League
Runners-up (1): 2012–13
Third Place (1): 2009–10
 Durand Cup
Runners-up (1): 2014

Invitational
 Bhutan King's Cup
Runners-up (1): 2014

Junior team
U17
Football Challenge Cup Chandigarh
Winners (1): 2015
U20
I-League U20
Champions (2): 2012, 2013

Performance in AFC competitions

AFC Champions League: 1 appearance
2014: Qualifying play-off Round 1AFC Cup: 1 appearance
2014: Group Stage

Record

See also

 Pune F.C. Academy
 Football clubs in Maharashtra
 Sports in Maharashtra
 Indian football clubs in Asian competitions

References

Further reading

External links
Pune FC at Soccerway

Pune FC at WorldFootball.net
 Pune FC at Global Sports Archive

 
Association football clubs established in 2007
I-League clubs

Football clubs in Pune
2007 establishments in Maharashtra
Defunct football clubs in India
Association football clubs disestablished in 2015
2015 disestablishments in India
I-League 2nd Division clubs